Deathwatch, Death Watch, or Death-Watch may refer to:

Books
 Death-Watch, a 1935 novel by John Dickson Carr
 Deathwatch (novel), a 1972 novel by Robb White
 Deathwatch (play), French playwright Jean Genet's earliest play (Haute Surveillance), written in 1947
 Deathwatch, a 1985 play by Nigel Williams
 Deathwatch (comics), a supervillain from the Ghost Rider series of comics

Film and TV
 Deathwatch (1965 film), English language film version of Jean Genet's play, produced by Vic Morrow and Leonard Nimoy
 Death Watch (La Mort en direct), a 1980 Franco-German-British science fiction film shot in Glasgow
 Deathwatch (2002 film), a 2002 war/horror film set during World War I
"Death-Watch", the twelfth episode of Series C of Blake's 7 first broadcast 24 March 1980
 Death Watch, a Mandalorian sect in the Star Wars expanded universe

Games
Deathwatch (role-playing game), the third game in the Warhammer 40,000 Roleplay sub-franchise
Warhammer 40,000: Deathwatch, a 2015 video game
 Ancients 1: Deathwatch, a MS-DOS computer game
 Deathwatch (video game), an unreleased Atari Jaguar game by Data Design Interactive

See also
 Death watch beetle, an insect famed for making a distinctive ticking sound